Gameshastra  is a video game company headquartered in Hyderabad, India with offices in Japan and Europe. The company tests, develops and publishes games for  dedicated gaming consoles including the Sony PlayStation 3, PlayStation Portable, Nintendo DS, Wii,  as well as other platforms including iOS, Android, Mac OS X, and Windows PCs.

History
 14 Jan 2013: In partnership with Hungama, Gameshastra launched an android game based on an upcoming Bollywood movie Race 2
 18 Dec 2011: Gameshastra launched android and iOS game based on the Bollywood movie Don 2
 23 Feb 2010: Gameshastra expands relationship with Sony
 23 Feb 2010: Gameshastra opens 1000-seat facility in Hyderabad
 6 December 2007: Gameshastra wins Red Herring 100 Global Award 2007
 21 February 2007: Gameshastra launches advanced game services facility in India

Games released by Gameshastra
 Cricket Challenge 
 Desi Adda
 Route 66
 Circles, Circles, Cricles
 D-Cube Planet 
 Crime Spree 
 Tiger Trouble 
 Pachisi 
 Taj Mahal 
 Flick Fishing 
 Great Pyramids 
 Tumblebugs 2 
 Numerology 
 Rangy Lil 
 Deflector 
 Secrets of Great Art 
 Can You See What I see 
 Paper Chase 
 Family Feud: Dram Home 
 Etch a Sketch 
 Nocturnal

Games released for movies

Don 2: The Game (2011)
Krrish 3: The Game (2013)
Kochadaiiyaan: Kingdom Run (2014)
Kochadaiiyaan: Reign Of Arrows (2014)
Anjaan: Race Wars (2014)
Happy New Year: The Game

Awards and honors 
Red Herring 100 Global Award 2007

References 

Video game development companies
Video game companies of India